Die Freude reget sich (Joy awakens), BWV 36.3, BWV36b), is a secular cantata composed by Johann Sebastian Bach. Bach drew on material he had composed more than a decade earlier for the cantata Schwingt freudig euch empor, BWV 36.1.

History and text 
Bach wrote several works for celebrations of the Leipzig University, Festmusiken zu Leipziger Universitätsfeiern. The cantata was probably performed in the university church, the Paulinerkirche.

In 1727 Christian Friedrich Henrici (Picander) had published an earlier version of the text, the birthday cantata Steigt freudig in die Luft, BWW 36a, which was also set by Bach. Picander was probably the author of the adaptation for the university celebration.

Scoring and structure 

The cantata is scored for four soloists, soprano, alto, tenor and bass, a four-part choir, flauto traverso, two oboes d'amore, two violins, viola and basso continuo.

 Chorus: 
 Recitative (tenor): 
 Aria (tenor): 
 Recitative (alto): 
 Aria (alto): 
 Recitative (soprano): 
 Aria (soprano): 
 Chorus and recitative (tenor, alto, soprano):

Music 
As in BWV 36.1, the first movement is cheerful in nature, and the tenor aria includes a significant oboe d'amore line. The final movement is a "jolly chorus with interpolated recitative".

There are also related sacred cantatas, two versions of the church cantata for the First Sunday in Advent, Schwingt freudig euch empor, BWV 36.

The cantata is unusual in being a secular work which was parodied as a sacred work and then, some five years later again as a secular work. Bach's parodies are usually secular to sacred rather than sacred to secular. The explanation given for the prevalence of secular to sacred parodies is that occasional secular works such as birthday cantatas had a single use and then Bach was able to reuse them as sacred works.

Recordings 

 Bach Kantaten, Wolfgang Unger, Leipziger Universitätschor, Pauliner Barockensemble, Linda Perillo, Matthias Koch, Nils Giesecke, Thorofon
 Edition Bachakademie Vol. 139 – Congratulatory and Hommage Cantatas, Helmuth Rilling, Gächinger Kantorei, Bach-Collegium Stuttgart, Christiane Oelze, Ingeborg Danz, Marcus Ullmann, Hänssler

References

Sources 

Scores
 

General
 Cantata BWV 36b Die Freude reget sich history, scoring, sources for text and music, translations to various languages, discography, discussion, Bach Cantatas Website
 BWV 36b Die Freude reget sich English translation, University of Vermont
 BWV 36b Die Freude reget sich text, scoring, University of Alberta

Secular cantatas by Johann Sebastian Bach
1735 compositions